Jibanananda Das Award is a literary award for outstanding works of poetry in translation from Indian languages into English. The award has been instituted in the memory of the Bengali poet Jibanananda Das. It is conferred by Kolkata Poetry Confluence in collaboration with Antonym Magazine and Bhasha Samsad.

Award winners
The following are Jibanananda Das Award winners for poetry translated from Indian languages into English. Original author names precede translator names :-

 Assamese :- Sameer Tanti by Harshita Hiya 
 Bengali :-Mohammad Nurul Huda by Indrani Bhattacharya
 Gujarati :- Kamal Vora by Pratishtha Pandya 
 Hindi :- Anamika by Pallavi Singh 
 Kashmiri :- Naseem Shafaie by Mohammad Zahid
 Malayalam :- K. Satchidanandan by Ajir Kutty
 Marathi :- Santosh Pawar by Santosh Rathod 
 Odia :- Saroj Bal by Snehaprava Das
 Tamil :- Sukirtharani by Deepalakshmi Joseph
 Urdu :- Munawwar Rana by Tapan Kumar Pradhan

References

Sahitya Akademi Prize for Translation
Indian literary awards
Awards established in 1989
Translation awards
Poetry awards
Indian poetry